Ali Akbar Khan is a Muslim Man's name, and may refer to:

Ali Akbar Khan, an Indian classical musician, son of Allauddin Khan of the Maihar Gharana
Ali-Akbar Khan Shahnazi, a Persian musician

See also
Akbar Ali Khan (disambiguation)

A. A. Khan (disambiguation)